Cryptomyces is a genus of fungi within the Cryptomycetaceae family.
The searches throughout Europe that have been conducted for this fungi since 2000 revealed sites only in Southwest Wales, Slovakia, and Northern Sweden.

References

External links
Index Fungorum

Leotiomycetes genera